Mara is a comune (municipality) in the Province of Sassari in the Italian region Sardinia, located about  northwest of Cagliari and about  south of Sassari.

Mara borders the following municipalities: Cossoine, Padria, Pozzomaggiore.

Monuments and places of interest

Religious buildings 

 Sanctuary of Our Lady of Bonu Ighinu 
 Church of Saint John
 Church of Saint Cross

Caves 

 Cave of Sa Ucca de su Tintirriolu
 Cave of Filiestru

References

Cities and towns in Sardinia